Anders Järryd and Jonas Svensson were the defending champions, but none competed this year.

Kevin Curren and David Pate won the title by defeating Peter Lundgren and Mikael Pernfors 6–2, 6–2 in the final.

Seeds
All seeds received a bye to the second round.

Draw

Finals

Top half

Bottom half

References

External links
 Official results archive (ATP)
 Official results archive (ITF)

U.S. National Indoor Championships
1988 Grand Prix (tennis)